Mill Creek Nature Park is a  municipal park located in Riverview, New Brunswick, Canada. The park is owned by the Town of Riverview and is managed in collaboration with the Friends of Mill Creek, a community-led advisory committee. Mill Creek Nature Park is home to a network of trails which are used for year-round activities, including walking, cycling, and skiing. The park encompasses part of the Mill Creek watershed and includes a diverse array of habitats, such as mixed forests and wetlands. Common species include forest birds, such as black-capped chickadee, common yellowthroat, and ovenbird, and mammals such as American red squirrel, snowshoe hare, and American beaver. The most prominent feature in Mill Creek is an old dam and reservoir which were created by the Department of National Defence in the early 1960s.

History 

Mill Creek Nature Park is located south of the former Canadian Forces Station Coverdale, which was constructed by the Royal Canadian Navy in 1944. The station conducted operations pertaining to high-frequency direction finding, which was used to monitor German communications during World War II. During its early years, the base was referred to as Special Wireless Station Coverdale and was operated by the Women's Royal Canadian Naval Service. In the late 1940s, the base was renamed to Her Majesty's Canadian Ship (HMCS) Coverdale, which it is still often referred to as today. In the early 1960s, new facilities were installed which necessitated an increase in the base's water supply. To accommodate this, a concrete buttress dam was built on the nearby Mill Creek, creating a 5 hectare reservoir which still exists today. In 1966, the base was designated as Canadian Forces Station (CFS) Coverdale, a title that it maintained until its closure in 1971. While most have undergone renovations, many of the original buildings still remain, including the Coverdale Centre and the Victory Life Centre. The dam and reservoir are now owned by the Town of Riverview and are located within the present-day Mill Creek Nature Park. 

In the late 2000s, the Town of Riveriew, in cooperation with the City of Moncton's Urban Planning, began working on a plan to designate Mill Creek as a future park. A proposal put forward by students from Riverview High School in 2011 was followed by a public consultation process, which led to the development of master plan.  In 2013, the park was officially established and work began on the development of trails. In 2016, the Friends of Mill Creek advisory committee was formed to assist the Town with the park's ongoing planning and management.

Features and Amenities 

Mill Creek Nature Park has a network of developed and undeveloped trails, which are used for a wide array of activities, including walking and cycling in the summer and snowshoeing, fat biking, and cross-country skiing in the winter. A scenic lookout above the reservoir includes a shelter, public fire pit, and benches, and is designated as one of the Fundy Biosphere Reserve's Amazing Places. The park continues to see ongoing development and has become a popular destination for outdoor recreation in the Greater Moncton-area.

See also 

 Riverview, New Brunswick
 Fundy Biosphere Reserve
 CFS Coverdale

References

External links
 

2013 establishments in New Brunswick
Municipal parks in New Brunswick
Riverview, New Brunswick